The Big Money Shot is an annual contest hosted by Ottawa’s alternative radio station, Live 88.5. The contest’s main objective is to give exposure to original local bands to help launch their career.

About 
The Big Money Shot contest began in 2006 and continues today. It is hosted by Ottawa’s alternative rock radio station, Live 88.5. Newcap Radio is the radio broadcaster that owns Live 88.5 and supports the contest.
Newcap’s resources allow local bands to have a unique and special exposure. Also, artist can be featured on Newcap Radio’s stations.
 60 artists will have the chance to listen to industry leaders guest speak.
 15 bands will have private consultations with industry experts to help with the development of their music. These experts come from labels such as, Universal Music, EMI Music, Warner Music and Sony Music.
 Bands can be heard by Canadian professionals in the business. These names include: Mike Fraser, Nick Blagona, Gavin Brown, David Bottrill, and David Ogilvie.
 6 groups will tour Ontario for 5 shows.

Process 
In order to enter the contest, each group must submit a CD with 5 original songs, a band biography and picture.

Stage One 

 60 artists are accepted into the contest.
 The Big Money Shot workshops are available for the groups to attend. It is at these workshops that industry leaders will be guest speakers.
 Artists will have one chance to perform live at this stage. There must be at least 20 people at the venue to see the show in order for the band to continue on.
 The bands must video tape their performance and submit one song to Live 88.5 to be posted on the web page.
 30 bands will move on to the next stage. The 5 bands with the most peer votes on the website and 25 bands chosen by the judges are those that will continue on.

Stage Two 

 Artists must create a business plan that outlines how the artist will use the prize money should they win the contest. This business plan must have approximate dates and monetary amounts to outline the spending.
 15 bands will continue on in the competition

Stage Three 

 Artists will have one on one mentoring with a songwriter and a producer to create a new song.
 The new song is sent in to Live 88.5 for air play. The songs are posted on Facebook for fan voting.
 Artists are required to perform a live show and have a minimum audience of 50 people.
 The judges will consider the performance, the song and the fan voting to determine which 6 bands to continue on.

Stage Four 

 Artists will tour Ontario for 5 shows. The tour will be organized by Live 88.5.
 All artists will perform in one final concert.
 The winner will be given a development package valued at $25,000. Runners-up will be given development packages valued at $5,000.

Past winners 
 The Cardboard Crowns (1st place 2013)
 The Goodluck Assembly
 Hollerado
 Autumns Canon(1st place 2010)
 The Balconies
 My Favourite Tragedy
 Down In Ashes (3rd place 2011)
 Amos the Transparent
 The Love Machine (1st place 2011)
 Loudlove
 Ty Hall
 Benefit of a Doubt
 Amanda Rheaume
 Hearts & Mines (2nd place 2011)
 The Strain (1st place 2012)
 The Lionyls (1st Place 2014)

Bibliography 
Live 88.5. "About the Big Money Shot." Live 88.5|-. Newcap Radio, n.d. Web. 29 Sept. 2012. <https://web.archive.org/web/20120926112259/http://www.live885.com/index.asp?mn=8>.
Live 88.5. "Big Money Shot Info." Live 88.5. Newcap Radio, n.d. Web. 29 Sept. 2012. <https://web.archive.org/web/20120926112259/http://www.live885.com/index.asp?mn=8>.
Newfoundland Capital Corporation. "Our Stations." Newcap Radio. 	Newfoundland 	Capital Corporation, n.d. Web. 29 Sept. 2012. <http://ncc.ca/stations.asp?mn=2>.

Events in Ottawa
Music competitions in Canada